is a passenger railway station in the city of Minamibōsō, Chiba Prefecture, Japan, operated by the East Japan Railway Company (JR East).

Lines
Minamihara Station is served by the Uchibō Line, and is located 102.2 km from the western terminus of the line at Soga Station.

Station layout
The station is an at-grade station with two sets of rails running between two opposing side platforms connected by a footbridge. The station is a Kan'i itaku station operated by the Minamibōsō municipal authority, with point-of-sales terminal installed.

Platforms

History
Minamihara Station was opened on June 1, 1921. The station was absorbed into the JR East network upon the privatization of the Japan National Railways (JNR) on April 1, 1987. A new station building was completed in January 2003.

Passenger statistics
In fiscal 2019, the station was used by an average of 453 passengers daily (boarding passengers only).

Surrounding area
 
 
 Former Asahi Town Hall

See also
 List of railway stations in Japan

References

External links

 JR East Station information  

Railway stations in Chiba Prefecture
Railway stations in Japan opened in 1921
Uchibō Line
Minamibōsō